1881 Shao, provisional designation  or , is a background asteroid from the outer regions of the asteroid belt, approximately  in diameter. It was discovered on 3 August 1940, by German astronomer Karl Reinmuth at the Heidelberg Observatory in southwest Germany. The presumed C-type asteroid has a rotation period of 7.45 hours. It was named for Chinese astronomer Cheng-yuan Shao.

Orbit and classification 

Shao is a non-family asteroid from the main belt's background population. It orbits the Sun in the outer main-belt at a distance of 2.8–3.5 AU once every 5 years and 8 months (2,062 days; semi-major axis of 3.17 AU). Its orbit has an eccentricity of 0.11 and an inclination of 10° with respect to the ecliptic. The body's observation arc begins with its official discovery observation at Heidelberg in 1940.

Physical characteristics 

Shao is an assumed carbonaceous C-type asteroid.

Rotation period 

In July 2013, a rotational lightcurve of Shao was obtained from photometric observations by Italian amateur astronomer Silvano Casulli. Lightcurve analysis gave a rotation period of 7.452 hours with a brightness variation of 0.15 magnitude. A second lightcurve by astronomers at the Palomar Transient Factory from December 2014, gave a shorter period of 5.61 hours and an amplitude of 0.11, indicative for a rather spherical shape.

Diameter and albedo 

According to the surveys carried out by the Japanese Akari satellite and the NEOWISE mission of NASA's Wide-field Infrared Survey Explorer, Shao measures between 24.083 and 25.46 kilometers in diameter and its surface has an albedo between 0.0994 and 0.115. The Collaborative Asteroid Lightcurve Link assumes a standard albedo for a carbonaceous asteroid of 0.057, and calculates a diameter of 29.21 kilometers based on an absolute magnitude of 11.4.

Naming 

This minor planet was named after Chinese astronomer Cheng-yuan Shao (born 1927), an assistant to Richard McCrosky (see previously numbered ) in Harvard's minor-planet program at the Harvard–Smithsonian Center for Astrophysics and Oak Ridge Observatory in Massachusetts, United States. Shao was also involved in the recovery of near-Earth asteroid 1862 Apollo. The official  was published by the Minor Planet Center on 20 February 1976.

References

External links 
 Asteroid Lightcurve Database (LCDB), query form (info )
 Dictionary of Minor Planet Names, Google books
 Asteroids and comets rotation curves, CdR – Observatoire de Genève, Raoul Behrend
 Discovery Circumstances: Numbered Minor Planets (1)-(5000) – Minor Planet Center
 
 

001881
Discoveries by Karl Wilhelm Reinmuth
Named minor planets
19400803